Jérôme Pétion de Villeneuve (3 January 1756 – 24 June 1794) was a French writer and politician who served as the second mayor of Paris, from 1791 to 1792.

Early life and work
Jérôme Pétion de Villeneuve was the son of a prosecutor at Chartres. Though it is known that he was trained as a lawyer, very few specifics are known about Petion's early life, as he was virtually unknown prior to the French Revolution. He became a lawyer in 1778, and at once began to try to make a name in literature. His first printed work was an essay, which failed to gain the prize for which it was composed, but pleased Brissot so much that he printed it in vol. vii. of his .

He also attacked long-held Ancien Régime traditions such as primogeniture, accusing it of dividing the countryside into "proletarians and colossal properties." Later works penned by Pétion include his account of Haiti entitled "" (1790) and "" in which he chides France for its corruption.

When the elections to the Estates-General took place in 1789 he was elected a deputy to the Tiers Etat for Chartres. Both in the assembly of the Tiers Etat and in the Constituent Assembly Pétion showed himself a radical leader. Although Petion was overshadowed in the Assembly by such orators as Mirabeau and Barnave, his close relationship with Girondin leader Brissot provided him with helpful advice on political conduct. He supported Mirabeau on 23 June, attacked the queen on 5 October, and was elected president on 4 December 1790. On 15 June 1791 he was elected president of the criminal tribunal of Paris. On 21 June 1791 he was chosen one of three commissioners appointed to bring back the king from Varennes, and he has left an account of the journey. After the last meeting of the assembly on 30 September 1791 Robespierre and Pétion were made the popular heroes and were crowned by the populace with civic crowns.

Mayor of Paris
From 24 October - 11 November Pétion visited London and had dinner with Thomas Paine. By late 1791, administrative control of Paris was dominated by the Jacobins and mayor Jean-Sylvain Bailly had resigned due to constant political attacks from the left. Pétion received a still further proof of the affection of the Parisians for him on 16 November 1791, when he was elected second mayor of Paris in succession to Bailly in a contest against Lafayette. (Only 10% of eligible citizens cast a vote, and Pétion won 60% of votes cast). In his mayoralty he exhibited clearly his republican tendency and his hatred of the old monarchy, especially on 20 June 1792, when he allowed the mob to overrun the Tuileries and insult the royal family. For neglecting to protect the Tuileries he was suspended from his functions on 6 July by Louis Alexandre de La Rochefoucauld, the president of the Directory of the Seine département, but the leaders of the Legislative Assembly felt that Pétion's cause was theirs, and rescinded the suspension on 13 July. The next day he was installed. On 4 August, at the head of the municipality of Paris, Pétion demanded the deposition of the king. Following news of the Duke of Brunswick's Prussian Army and the Battle of Verdun (1792), fear encouraged frenzied Parisian mobs to target prisoners, royalist sympathizers, and Catholic priests in a series of acts of violence that would come to be known as the September Massacres.

Convention, flight and death
After his election he stood down as Mayor of Paris and Nicolas Chambon de Montaux was elected to replace him. L.P. Manuel proposed that the president of the Assembly should have the same authority as the president of the United States; his proposition was at once rejected, but Pétion got the nickname of "Roi Pétion," which contributed to his fall. With disagreements over such items as the necessity of the September Massacres, the Convention was a scene of large-scale political infighting between different factions. His jealousy of Robespierre allied him to the Girondin party, with which he voted for the king's death and for the appeal to the people. He participated to the Constitution Committee that drafted the Girondin constitutional project. He was elected in March 1793 to the commission (not the committee) of Public Safety and attacked Robespierre, who had accused him of having known and having kept secret Dumouriez's project of restoring the French Constitution of 1791.

Pétion's name was among those of the twenty-two Girondin deputies proscribed on 2 June 1793 (see Insurrection of 31 May – 2 June 1793). At last, a month before Robespierre's fall on 27 July 1794, the escaped deputies felt themselves no longer safe, and deserted their asylum. Salle and Guadet were arrested on 18 June, taken to Bordeaux and guillotined the next day. Barbaroux was guillotined on 25 June after a botched suicide attempt on 18 June. The bodies of Pétion and Buzot, who had succeeded in killing themselves on 18 June, were found in a field, half eaten by wolves on 27 June.

See Mémoires inédits du Pétion et mémoires de Buzot et de Barbaroux, accompagnés de notes inédites de Buzot et de nombreux documents inédits sur Barbaroux, Buzot, Brissot, etc., précédés d'une introduction par C. A. Dauban (Paris, 1866); Œuvres du Pétion (3 vols., 1792); FA Aulard, Les Orateurs de la Constituante (Paris, 1882).

Notes

References
 
Adolphus, John. Biographical Memoirs of the French Revolution. T. Cadell, jun. and W. Davies, 1799.
Andress, David. The Terror. New York: Farrar, Straus and Giroux, 2005.
Bell, David A. "The Unbearable Lightness of Being French: Law, Republicanism and National Identity at the End of the Old Regime." The American Historical Review 106, 4 (Oct 2001): 1215–1235.
Hunt, Lynn. Politics, Culture, and Class in the French Revolution. Berkeley; Los Angeles: University of California Press, 1984, 2004.
Markoff, John. "Peasants Help Destroy an Old Regime and Defy a New One: Some Lessons from (and for) the Study of Social Movements." The American Journal of Sociology 102, 4 (Jan 1997): 1113–1142.
Phillips, Glenn O. "The Caribbean Collection at the Moorland-Spingarn Research Center, Howard University." Latin American Research Review 15, 2 (1980): 162–178.

1756 births
1794 deaths
Mayors of Paris
French politicians who committed suicide
Presidents of the National Convention
Regicides of Louis XVI
Writers from Chartres
18th-century suicides
Politicians from Chartres